John Robert Barnes (20 May 1905 – 6 October 1999) was an Australian rules footballer who played with South Melbourne in the Victorian Football League (VFL) during the 1920's.

Born in Williamstown, Barnes was used mostly as a forward and kicked 34 goals in 1928, including a bag of six against Geelong at Lake Oval. His son Ken played at South Melbourne in the 1960's.

Barnes also represented Victoria in a first-class cricket match in 1930 as a right-handed batsman. Playing against Tasmania at the MCG, Barnes batted in the middle order and made 51. It would be his only innings at first-class level. Fellow VFL footballers Stuart King and Heinrich Schrader also played in that match for Victoria.

After leaving South Melbourne, Barnes played for Williamstown in the VFA from 1930 - 34, notching up 67 games and kicking 76 goals. He was captain and vice-captain at times during 1931 and 1932 and was vice-captain in 1934 until he quit the Club after a dispute following a 20-goal defeat at Toorak Park against Prahran in round 8. He then transferred to Williamstown District as captain-coach and won the VFA Sub-Districts competition best and fairest award despite playing just six games.

See also
 List of Victoria first-class cricketers

References

External links

Jack Barnes's playing statistics from The VFA Project
Cricinfo profile: Jack Barnes

1905 births
1999 deaths
Australian Rules footballers: place kick exponents
Sydney Swans players
Williamstown Football Club players
Australian cricketers
Victoria cricketers
Australian rules footballers from Melbourne
Cricketers from Melbourne
People from Williamstown, Victoria